The Eelam National Democratic Liberation Front (ENDLF) is a former Indian backed Tamil militant group in Sri Lanka. It was formed in 1987 as an amalgamation of splinter groups from other militant groups (Eelam People's Revolutionary Liberation Front, People's Liberation Organisation of Tamil Eelam, Tamil Eelam Liberation Organization). It is currently a pro-government paramilitary group and political party. In August 2011 it was reported that the party is to be deregistered.

Formation
Gnanapiragasam Gnanasekaran (alias Paranthan Rajan), a leading member of PLOTE, formed the Three Stars militant group with splinter groups of TELO and EPRLF after leaving PLOTE. In 1987, Three Stars merged with a PLOTE splinter group led by Jotheeswaran (alias Kannan) and an EPRLF splinter group led by Douglas Devananda to form the Eelam National Democratic Liberation Front. This was done with the support of the Research and Analysis Wing, the Indian intelligence agency. Devananda left the ENDLF and formed the Eelam People's Democratic Party after the Indo-Sri Lanka Accord was signed.

Politics
The ENDLF was very active during the Indian Peace Keeping Force's occupation of north-east Sri Lanka between 1987 and 1990. It took part in the 1988 North Eastern provincial council election and the 1989 parliamentary election. When the IPKF withdrew in 1990 the ENDLF also retreated to India. Thereafter the ENDLF remained dormant until the 2004 defection of LTTE commander Karuna. Karuna joined the ENDLF and became its president. The ENDLF soon started taking a very anti-LTTE stance. Karuna has since left the ENDLF but the ENDLF remains a pro-government paramilitary group and political party.

References
 
 

Factions in the Sri Lankan Civil War
Tamil political parties in Sri Lanka
Political parties in Sri Lanka
Foreign intervention in the Sri Lankan Civil War
Indian Peace Keeping Force
Paramilitary organisations based in Sri Lanka
1987 establishments in Sri Lanka
Political parties established in 1987